Green TV India is a 24-hour Hindi agricultural television channel owned by Nomad Films Ltd. The channel is aimed predominantly at the rural and semi-urban population of India. 
Green TV is accessible all over India as part of the ‘Digital India’ movement, with smartphones all around, even in rural and semi-urban India.

The shows on the channel include programming on scientific advances in agriculture and animal husbandry, economic and administrative policies and trends in agriculture, market, and industry as well as music shows, food shows, alternative career shows, and much more.

There are over 32 shows on the run and each housing different segments.
Green TV has over 204,462 subscribers.

History :
Conceived in 2010 by Nomad films, Green TV India is India's 1st private satellite channel with 24-hour programming focused on Agriculture with rural and small town audience when it was launched as a satellite Television channel on August 15, 2014, and an online digital channel on October 17, 2012. It is Junaid Memon's contrivance the co-founder of Nomad Films. He has produced 7 feature films and over 350 ad films.

The channel has 30 shows running at any given time, each catering to a particular segment of information, knowledge or entertainment of its audience. These shows are well-researched and documented to avoid any misinformation going out to the viewers. The programming is controlled and directed by Junaid Memon, the owner of Nomad Films and the founder of the channel.

References

Hindi-language television channels in India
Agriculture in India
Television channels and stations established in 2014
2014 establishments in India
Television channels based in Noida
Agricultural television stations

External links 
 {https://www.khaleejtimes.com/local-business/green-tv-indias-only-private-channel-for-farmers}